Mirtha is a female given name. Notable people with the name include:

 Mirtha Brock (born April 9, 1970), Colombian athlete
Mirtha Colón (born 1951), Honduran activist
Mirtha Dermisache (1940–2012), Argentine artist
Mirtha Legrand (born 1927), Argentine actress and television presenter
Mirtha Marrero, Cuban pitcher
 Mirtha Michelle (born 1984), American actress
Mirtha N. Quintanales, Cuban feminist and writer
Mirtha Reid (1918–1981), Uruguayan actress
 Mirtha Rivero (born 1956), Venezuelan journalist and writer
Mirtha Vásquez (born 1975), Peruvian lawyer

Feminine given names